Buonconvento railway station is an Italian railway station on the Siena-Grosseto railway line in Southern Tuscany.

History
Buonconvento railway station was opened on 30 May 1927 on a line that was built to provide a quicker connection between Siena and Grosseto than the original Asciano-Monte Antico section, connecting with the rest of the 1872-built line at Monte Antico. This station was one of the most important on the line, and until the late 1990s still accepted freight traffic from Siena and farther afield using its two sidings and warehouse. The station has two platform faces, as a large percentage of trains pass each other here. It is one of the busiest on the line, one reason being its proximity to the tourist hub of Montalcino and the Abbey of Monte Oliveto Maggiore, as well as being a public transport gateway to the Val d'Orcia, which is recognised as a UNESCO World Heritage Site. Also, Buonconvento is a member of I Borghi più belli d'Italia, and was promoted by Trenitalia in 2021 as a recommended place to visit, generating tourism through the station.

Train services and movements
Regular passenger services to the station are regionale services, which run daily to Grosseto and Siena and in early mornings and evenings to Empoli and Florence. There is also a daily regionale veloce service from here to Florence. Trenonatura historic steam and diesel trains running through the Val d'Orcia along the Asciano-Monte Antico line pass through the station on their itinerary from Siena on selected dates of the year.

Gallery

See also

History of rail transport in Italy
List of railway stations in Tuscany
Rail transport in Italy
Railway stations in Italy

References 

Railway stations in Tuscany
1927 establishments in Italy
Railway stations in Italy opened in the 20th century